Isabel station is a planned railway station in Livermore, California. It is expected to open in 2028 as a stop for Valley Link. The station's parking lot and bus bays are located on the north side of East Airway Boulevard while the platforms and rails are located in the median strip of Interstate 580 just east of Isabel Avenue.

The station was initially envisioned as being served by Bay Area Rapid Transit (BART) with an extension of the Dublin/Pleasanton line. In July 2011, the Livermore City Council voted to favor that stations be built at the Interstate 580 interchanges with Isabel Avenue and Greenville Road rather than downtown, as had been planned. The BART board voted against constructing any eastward extension in May 2018, thus granting the new Tri-Valley-San Joaquin Valley Regional Rail Authority oversight and funding for construction of a new rail service. Isabel station was integrated into the new plans.

References

Livermore, California
Railway stations scheduled to open in 2028
Future Valley Link stations